Chuck Burley (born January 10, 1956) is an American Republican politician who served in the Oregon House of Representatives from 2005 until 2009.

Career
Burley moved to Bend, Oregon in 1993, and served as a U.S. Forest Service official. He was elected to the 73rd Oregon Legislative Assembly in 2004, and served until 2009, when he was defeated by Democrat Judy Stiegler.

References

1956 births
Living people
Republican Party members of the Oregon House of Representatives
Colorado State University alumni
Politicians from Bend, Oregon
Politicians from Cleveland
21st-century American politicians